Anja Zavadlav (born 11 May 1960) is a Slovenian former alpine skier who competed for Yugoslavia in the 1980 Winter Olympics and 1984 Winter Olympics.

External links
 sports-reference.com

1960 births
Living people
Slovenian female alpine skiers
Olympic alpine skiers of Yugoslavia
Alpine skiers at the 1980 Winter Olympics
Alpine skiers at the 1984 Winter Olympics
Skiers from Ljubljana
Yugoslav female alpine skiers
Universiade medalists in alpine skiing
Universiade silver medalists for Yugoslavia
Competitors at the 1983 Winter Universiade